The number of Kurdish villages depopulated by Turkey is estimated at around 3,000. Since 1984, the Turkish military has embarked on a campaign to eradicate the Kurdistan Workers Party, a militant Kurdish opposition group. As a result, by the year 2000 some 30,000 people have died, and two million Kurdish refugees have been driven out of their homes into overcrowded urban shanty towns.

Background
Until 1970s, about 70% of the Kurdish population of Turkish Kurdistan, inhabited one of the approximately 20,000 Kurdish villages. But by 1985, only 58% of the population were still living in the rural areas and much of the countryside in Kurdish populated regions has been depopulated by the Turkish government, with Kurdish civilians moving to local centers such as Diyarbakır, Van, and Şırnak, as well as to the cities of western Turkey and even to western Europe. The causes of the depopulation were in most cases the Turkish state's military operations and to a lesser extent attacks by the PKK on villages it deemed defended by collaborators of the Turkish Government. Often Kurds had to decide whether to become a member of the state-sponsored Village Guards, be deported or else they could face attacks by the PKK. Human Rights Watch has documented many instances where the Turkish military forcibly evacuated villages, destroying houses and equipment to prevent the return of the inhabitants. An estimated 3,000 Kurdish villages in Southeast Anatolia were virtually wiped from the map, representing the displacement of more than 378,000 people. During the 1990s, the Turkish military reportedly deployed the US manufactured helicopters Sikorsky and Cobra to drive out the Kurdish population from the villages.

Depopulated and demolished towns and villages

According to the Humanitarian Law Project, 2,400 Kurdish villages were destroyed and 18,000 Kurds were executed, by the Turkish government. Other estimates have put the number of destroyed Kurdish villages at over 4,000. In total up to 3,000,000 people (mainly Kurds) have been displaced.

The Kurdish Human Rights Project divides the depopulation (evacuation) of villages in 5 phases.

 The initial phase between 1985 and 1989 
 The phase of centralization during 1990–1991
 the phase of the systematic village evacuation between 1992 and 1993
 the phase of the escalation of the village evacuation in 1994
 between 1995 and 2001 other villages further villages were depopulated

An estimated of 1,000,000 are still internally displaced as of 2009.

Timeline

1992 
November – Kelekçi village destruction

Government compensation
The Internal Displacement Monitoring Centre stated in 2009 that the Turkish Government has taken "notable" steps to address the internal displacement situation. These include commissioning a national survey on the number and conditions of IDPs, drafting a national IDP strategy; adopting law on compensation and putting together a comprehensive pilot action plan in Van Province and 13 other south-eastern provinces addressing rural and urban situations of displacement.

See also 
Kurds in Turkey
Kurdish villages destroyed during the Iraqi Arabization campaign

References

External links 
 Kurds Are Finally Heard: Turkey Burned Our Villages
 THE DEFENCE OF HUMAN RIGHTS

Persecution of Kurds in Turkey
Former populated places in Turkey
Turkish settlements
Kurdish–Turkish conflict (1978–present)
Internal migration
Kurdish refugees
Forcibly depopulated communities